Gourmaëlon or Wrmaelon (died 913/4), was the Count of Cornouaille and de facto ruler of Brittany from 907 – . As ruler of Brittany he was considered Prince de Bretagne in some chronicles and histories. His actual history is among the least well documented of the early medieval rulers of Brittany. His reputed time of rule coincides with a dramatic increase in Viking invasions that ultimately led up to the Viking Occupation of Brittany that began after his death.

He is believed to have been named Count of Cornouaille by Alan I, King of Brittany near the end of his reign in 907. After Alan I's death in 907 he disputed the right of Alan's heirs to rule Brittany and fought for the control of the kingdom, albeit without claiming the title king.

His life and activities are sparsely recorded in historical documents save for several donations to the Breton churches of the day. In a donation to the monastery of Plélan in 910 he is identified as "ruler of Brittany". At Redon in 913 he is identified as Count Gourmaelon, the Breton monarch.

He is understood to have died in 913 (or 914) in a battle with invading Vikings.

No subsequent ruler of Brittany is recorded in histories or chronicles of the period until the return of Alan II, Duke of Brittany, known as Alan Barbetorte, from England –938.


Notes

References

Bibliography

Further reading
 
 

910s deaths
10th-century rulers of Brittany
Year of birth unknown
Dukes of Brittany
Princes of Brittany
Military personnel killed in action